ARSAT-3K is a geostationary communications satellite bus designed and manufactured by INVAP of Argentina for the local telecommunication company ARSAT S.A. It is a small (4.2 kW of power generation and  of launch mass) three axis stabilized platform designed, manufactured and tested completely in Argentina. It currently uses only chemical propulsion, but a hybrid solution which would use bi-propellant propulsion for orbit raising and electric propulsion for station keeping is being developed. A purely electric propulsion version is planned.

Platform Versions

ARSAT-3K
The ARSAT-3K is the initial version of this bus. It is comparable to the Thales Alenia Space Spacebus 3000B2. It uses an integrated chemical propulsion system supplied by EADS Astrium for both orbit raising and station keeping.

ARSAT-3H
The ARSAT-3H is the second version of this bus, which initiated its development during 2015. It will use an hybrid approach with bi-propellant propulsion for orbit raising and electric propulsion for station keeping.

ARSAT-3E
The ARSAT-3E will be the third version of the platform. It will use electric propulsion exclusively. It will keep the payload and power envelope of the ARSAT-3H while applying the improvements to cost and weight reduction.

List of satellites
The Argentine Geostationary Satellite Plan 2015-2035 establishes a roadmap for the platform development until 2035.

See also
 ARSAT S.A.
 INVAP
 ARSAT-1
 ARSAT-2
 ARSAT-3

References

Satellites of Argentina
Satellite buses
ARSAT-3K Bus
Communications satellites